Dylan Andrews (born 15 November 1979) is a mixed martial artist from New Zealand who most recently competed in the Welterweight division of Absolute Championship Berkut. A professional competitor since 2006, he has formerly competed in the UFC, and was a semi-finalist on FX's The Ultimate Fighter: Team Jones vs. Team Sonnen.

Early life and background
Dylan Andrews was born on 15 November 1979 in Wellington, New Zealand and is of Māori descent. He grew up around drugs and alcohol abuse and he was bullied at school. In his early years, Dylan played many sports, including rugby, cricket and squash.

He lived in Whakatane, New Zealand  and Woburn, New Zealand where he went to Hutt Valley High School between 1996 and 1997.

Education wasn’t a very high priority for Dylan or his family. He left school without qualifications and became a laborer; he also worked in an office.

Andrews moved to Australia's Gold Coast in 2003.

Mixed martial arts career

Early career
Dylan started his mixed martial arts (MMA) training in 2004 in the Lion’s Den Academy in Sydney, Australia, having stumbled into the Den while looking for Ultimate Fighting Championship (UFC) videos. He had his first professional MMA fight some two years later on 7 July 2006 where he beat Adam Narnst by TKO after only 52 seconds of the first round.

Over the next year and a half he won his next five fights inside the first two rounds.

Dylan had his first loss on  15 February 2008 to Brian Ebersole who at the time had won 37 of his 52 professional fights.

Over the next few years, Dylan slowly built his reputation as a tough and dedicated fighter. He defeated the likes of UFC fighter and The Ultimate Fighter Season 4 contestant, Shonie Carter. He refused to tap in his fight against Jesse Taylor when in a guillotine choke, the referee had to stop the fight as Andrews was unconscious at Australian Fighting Championship (AFC) 1.

He has fought in a number of inaugural fights, such as the first Cage Fighting Championship, Legend Fighting Championship and Australian Fighting Championship.

Dylan has a reputation as a tough and dedicated fighter: he refused to tap in his November 2010 fight against Jesse Taylor when in a guillotine choke, the referee had to stop the fight as Andrews was unconscious  and he had a round three knockout win over Papy Abedi in August 2013, even though he had dislocated his shoulder in the first round.

The Ultimate Fighter
Dylan tried three times to get onto The Ultimate Fighter, an American reality television series and MMA competition produced by the FX Network and the UFC. He failed to make it onto the thirteenth and fifteenth season of the show and the Australian-based series The Ultimate Fighter: The Smashes after underperforming at 170 pounds (77 kg). However, he didn’t give up and his persistence paid off when in January 2013, Andrews was announced as a cast member of The Ultimate Fighter: Team Jones vs. Team Sonnen (also known as TUF 17).

Dylan Andrews became the first Māori MMA fighter to compete in The Ultimate Fighter.

He won his way into the house by defeating Tim Williams by unanimous decision. However, he failed to impress either judge—he was the last pick for Team Jones and was the last pick overall.

Andrews fought Zak Cummings in the preliminary round and was victorious with a majority decision win after two rounds. Andrews next fought overall first pick, Luke Barnatt, in the quarter-finals. He defeated Barnatt in the third round via TKO due to punches. The bout was declared 'Fight of the Season'.

Andrews lost in the semi-finals to Uriah Hall via TKO due to punches in the second round.

Ultimate Fighting Championship
Andrews' first UFC fight was at The Ultimate Fighter 17 Finale against Jimmy Quinlan, who he defeated via TKO in the first round. Andrews won US$16,000 in his debut UFC fight.

Andrews next fought Papy Abedi on 28 August 2013 at UFC Fight Night 27. After being controlled for the first two rounds, Andrews mounted a comeback and won via knockout in the third round.

Andrews faced fellow The Ultimate Fighter 17 competitor Clint Hester on 7 December 2013 at UFC Fight Night 33. He lost the fight via TKO due to injury after dislocating his shoulder in the second round.

During his injury, Andrews and Ross Pearson helped promote UFC Fight Night: Te Huna vs. Marquardt through autograph signings, press conferences and Q&A sessions.

Andrews next faced Sam Alvey on 8 November 2014 at UFC Fight Night 55. He lost the fight via knockout due to hitting his head on the canvas during an attempted takedown and follow up punches from Alvey.

Andrews faced Brad Scott on 10 May 2015 at UFC Fight Night 65. Andrews lost the fight via submission in the second round.  Subsequently, Andrews was released from the organization.

Post UFC
Andrews rematched with  Papy Abedi on 1 April 2017 at Superior Challenge 15 in Stockholm, Sweden. He won the fight via knockout in round two and claimed the Middleweight Superior Challenge title.

Andrews faced Azamat Amagov on 9 December 2017 at Absolute Championship Berkut 76 in Gold Coast, Australia. He lost the fight via TKO in the second round.

Sponsorships and gyms
Dylan has sponsorships with Lonsdale London (Australia), who included him in their Real Fighters team, as well as with TapouT, ASN, Muscle Lab, Line Break Compression, Cocktail And Dreams and AST Performance.

Andrews started his MMA training in the Sydney Lion’s Den Academy training under Luke Pezzutti. He moved to the Five Rings Dojo, Gold Coast, Australia in 2008.  He now fights out of the Heartbreak Conditioning and PUMMA gyms on the Gold Coast, training under Vince Perry.

Dylan is known for his dedication in the gym:

Fighting style
Dylan is a boxer and a wrestler with an aggressive, dynamic fighting style. His quick, powerful hands and his strong wrestling base make him a force to be reckoned with, both on his feet and on the ground. He almost never leaves a fight in the judges’ hands, with only two of his 21 professional fights going the distance (he won both those fights).

Personal life
Dylan Andrews and his partner, Tracey, have a son, Tyrese, and a daughter, Nevaeh.
He likes to listen to Marvin Gaye, Bob Marley and Jack Johnson.

Andrews' nickname is the Villain, but he says he is nothing of the sort:

Championships and accomplishments
Ultimate Fighting Championship
The Ultimate Fighter 17 Fight of the Season
First New Zealander to compete on the Ultimate Fighter
Nitro MMA
Nitro Middleweight Championship (One time) 
Brazilian jiu-jitsu
New South Wales State jiu-jitsu Champion (2005, 2006 and 2007)

Mixed martial arts record 

|- 
|Loss
|align=center|18–11 (1)
|Rob Wilkinson
|Submission (guillotine choke)
|Australian FC 23
|
|align=center|1
|align=center|3:01
|Melbourne, Australia 
|Light Heavyweight bout.
|- 
|Loss
|align=center|18–10 (1)
|Priscus Fogagnolo
|Decision (unanimous)
|All Styles Grappling: MMA Fight Night 3
|
|align=center|3
|align=center|5:00
|Hobart, Australia 
|
|- 
|Loss
|align=center|18–9 (1)
|Nico Musoke
|Decision (unanimous)
|Superior Challenge 19
|
|align=center|3
|align=center|5:00
|Stockholm, Sweden 
|
|-
| Loss
| align=center|18–8 (1)
| Azamat Amagov
| TKO (punches and elbows)
| ACB 76: Young Eagles 23
| 
| align=center|2 
| align=center|1:08
| Gold Coast, Australia
|Welterweight bout.
|-
|Win
|align=center|18–7 (1)
|Papy Abedi
|KO (head kick)
|Superior Challenge 15
|
|align=center|2
|align=center|4:16
|Stockholm, Sweden
|
|-
|Loss
|align=center| 17–7 (1)
|Brad Scott
|Submission (guillotine choke) 
|UFC Fight Night: Miocic vs. Hunt
|
|align=center|2
|align=center|4:54
|Adelaide, Australia
|
|-
|Loss
|align=center|17–6 (1)
|Sam Alvey
|KO (punches)
|UFC Fight Night: Rockhold vs. Bisping
|
|align=center|1
|align=center|2:16
|Sydney, Australia
|
|-
|Loss
|align=center|17–5 (1)
|Clint Hester
|TKO (doctor stoppage)
|UFC Fight Night: Hunt vs. Bigfoot
|
|align=center|2
|align=center|5:00
|Brisbane, Australia
|
|-
|Win
|align=center|17–4 (1)
|Papy Abedi
|KO (punches)
|UFC Fight Night: Condit vs. Kampmann 2
|
|align=center|3
|align=center|1:32
|Indianapolis, Indiana, United States
|
|-
|Win
|align=center| 16–4 (1)
|Jimmy Quinlan
|TKO (punches)
|The Ultimate Fighter 17 Finale
|
|align=center|1
|align=center|3:22
|Las Vegas, Nevada, United States
|
|-
|Win
|align=center| 15–4 (1)
|Hale Vaa'sa
|Decision (unanimous)
|Nitro MMA 5
|
|align=center|3
|align=center|5:00
|Logan City, Australia
|
|-
|Win
|align=center| 14–4 (1)
|Steve Thomas
|TKO (retirement)
|Cage FC 20
|
|align=center|1
|align=center|5:00
|Gold Coast, Australia
|
|-
|Win
|align=center| 13–4 (1)
|Ross Dallow
|TKO (punches)
|Australian FC 2
|
|align=center|1
|align=center|0:57
|Melbourne, Australia
|
|-
|Win
|align=center| 12–4 (1)
|Rob Giuffrida
|TKO (punches)
|Nitro MMA 3
|
|align=center|2
|align=center|4:24
|Logan City, Australia
|
|-
|Loss
|align=center| 11–4 (1)
|Jesse Taylor
|Technical Submission (guillotine choke) 
|Australian FC 1
|
|align=center|1
|align=center|2:40
|Melbourne, Australia
|
|-
|Loss
|align=center| 11–3 (1)
|James Vainikolo
|Submission (rear-naked choke)
|Xtreme MMA 2 - ANZ vs. USA
|
|align=center|2
|align=center|4:14
|Sydney, Australia
|
|-
|Win
|align=center| 11–2 (1)
|Shonie Carter
|Decision (unanimous)
|Cage FC 13
|
|align=center|3
|align=center|5:00
|Gold Coast, Australia
|
|-
|NC
|align=center| 10–2 (1)
|Dorjderem Munkhbayasgala
|NC (punches to the back of the head)
|Legend FC 1
|
|align=center|1
|align=center|0:50
|Hong Kong, SAR, China
|
|-
|Win
|align=center| 10–2
|Jeff King
|Submission (guillotine choke)
|Cage FC 11
|
|align=center|1
|align=center|4:58
|Sydney, Australia
|
|-
|Win
|align=center| 9–2
|Yuji Hisamatsu
|TKO (punches)
|FightWorld Cup 2 - Return of the Warriors
|
|align=center|1
|align=center|2:33
|Nerang, Australia
|
|-
|Win
|align=center| 8–2
|Sandro Sampaio
|TKO (punches)
|TTCW 2 - North vs. South
|
|align=center|1
|align=center|1:02
|Canterbury, New Zealand
|
|-
|Loss
|align=center| 7–2
|Jacob O'Connell
|Submission (anaconda choke)
|Cage FC 6 - Eliminator
|
|align=center|1
|align=center|0:37
|Sydney, Australia
|
|-
|Win
|align=center| 7–1
|Marvin Arnold Bleau
|TKO (punches)
|TTCW 1 - Two Worlds Collide
|
|align=center|1
|align=center|1:50
|Canterbury, New Zealand
|
|-
|Loss
|align=center| 6–1
|Brian Ebersole
|TKO (punches)
|Cage FC 3
|
|align=center|2
|align=center|4:26
|Sydney, Australia
|
|-
|Win
|align=center| 6–0
|Api Hemara
|Submission (rear-naked choke)
|Cage FC 2
|
|align=center|2
|align=center|3:15
|Sydney, Australia
|
|-
|Win
|align=center| 5–0
|Kal Bacy
|TKO (punches)
|Cage FC 1
|
|align=center|1
|align=center|1:50
|Sydney, Australia
|
|-
|Win
|align=center| 4–0
|Stephen Walton
|Submission (rear-naked choke)
|Shooto Australia - Superfight Australia 1
|
|align=center|2
|align=center|4:23
|Perth, Australia
|
|-
|Win
|align=center| 3–0
|Yoann Gouaida
|TKO (punches)
|Warriors Realm 8
|
|align=center|2
|align=center|N/A
|Sunshine Coast, Australia
|
|-
|Win
|align=center| 2–0
|Lenny Kent
|KO (punches) 
|Warriors Realm 7
|
|align=center|1
|align=center|3:14
|Sunshine Coast, Australia
|
|-
|Win
|align=center| 1–0
|Adam Narnst
|TKO (punches)
|XFC 11
|
|align=center|1
|align=center|0:52
|Logan Central, Australia
|

Mixed martial arts exhibition record 

|-
|Loss
|align=center|3–1
|Uriah Hall
|TKO (punches)
|TUF 17
| (air date)
|align=center|2
|align=center|4:50
|Las Vegas, Nevada, United States
|
|-
|Win
|align=center|3–0
|Luke Barnatt
|TKO (punches)
|TUF 17
| (air date)
|align=center|3
|align=center|1:57
|Las Vegas, Nevada, United States
|
|-
|Win
|align=center|2–0
|Zak Cummings
|Decision (majority) 
|TUF 17
| (air date)
|align=center|2
|align=center|5:00
|Las Vegas, Nevada, United States
|
|-
|Win
|align=center|1–0
|Tim Williams
|Decision (unanimous) 
|TUF 17
| (air date)
|align=center|2
|align=center|5:00
|Las Vegas, Nevada, United States
|

See also
 List of current UFC fighters
 List of male mixed martial artists

References

External links 
 
 

1979 births
Living people
Sportspeople from Wellington City
Middleweight mixed martial artists
Mixed martial artists utilizing boxing
Mixed martial artists utilizing wrestling
Mixed martial artists from the Gold Coast
New Zealand male mixed martial artists
New Zealand Māori sportspeople
People educated at Hutt Valley High School
Ultimate Fighting Championship male fighters